Uyirthezhunnelppu is a 1985 Indian Malayalam film, directed by N. P. Suresh and produced by Purushan Alappuzha. The film stars Prem Nazir, Hari, Anuradha and Bobby Kottarakkara in the lead roles. The film has musical score by A. T. Ummer.

Cast
Prem Nazir
Hari
Anuradha
Bobby Kottarakkara
C. I. Paul
Disco Shanthi
Janardanan
Ranipadmini
Sangeetha
T. G. Ravi
Shanawas

Soundtrack
The music was composed by A. T. Ummer and the lyrics were written by Poovachal Khader.

References

External links
 

1985 films
1980s Malayalam-language films
Films directed by N. P. Suresh